Nick Herbig is an American football linebacker for the Wisconsin Badgers.

High school career
Herbig attended the Saint Louis School in Oahu, Hawaii. He played in the 2020 Polynesian Bowl. He committed to the University of Wisconsin to play college football.

College career
Herbig started all seven games his true freshman year at Wisconsin in 2020, recording 26 tackles and one sack. He returned as a starter in 2021, and had 61 tackles and nine sacks.

Personal life
His brother, Nate Herbig, played offensive guard for the Stanford Cardinal before signing as an undrafted free agent with the Philadelphia Eagles of the NFL.

References

External links

Wisconsin Badgers bio

Living people
Players of American football from Hawaii
Saint Louis School alumni
American football linebackers
Wisconsin Badgers football players
Year of birth missing (living people)